Nasty Savage is an American thrash metal band from Brandon, Florida, formed in 1983 by vocalist "Nasty" Ronnie Galletti. The band has undergone various lineup changes, with Galletti and guitarist David Austin remaining the only constant members, until the latter's departure in 2022.

Overview
Nasty Savage rose to popularity primarily due to singer "Nasty" Ronnie Galetti's over-the-top stage show performances (in early shows Ronnie smashed television sets over his head). They were extremely influential in the emergence of the Florida death metal scene, inspiring bands such as Death and Obituary. The second album Indulgence (1987), featuring the hit single "XXX", was recorded at Progressive Music in Tampa. These recordings helped to get the band signed with heavy metal label Metal Blade Records. After releasing three albums and one EP between 1985 and 1989 they broke up. After there had been speculation about a reunion for some time, their last studio album to date, Psycho Psycho, was released in the spring of 2004, and the band played occasional live shows before disbanding for the second time in 2012. In January 2016, it was reported that Nasty Savage had once again reformed and were working on a new album, which has since been slowly in progress.

Band members

Current 
 "Nasty" Ron Galletti – vocals (1983–1990, 2002–2012, 2016–present)
 Jim Coker – drums (2002–2003, 2016–present)
 Scott Carino – bass (2018–present)
 Pete Sykes – guitars (2018–present)
 Dave Orman – guitars (2022–present)

Former 
 Fred Dregischan – bass (1983–1985)
 Ben Meyer – guitars (1983–1990, 2002–2012)
 Demian Gordon – guitars (2016–2018)
 Dezso Istvan – bass (1985–1987)
 Chris Moorhouse – bass (1987–1988; died 1988)
 Richard Bateman – bass (1988–1990, 2002–2012, 2016–2018; died 2018)
 Curtis Beeson – drums (1983–1990, 2003–2012)
 David Austin – guitars (1983–1990, 2002–2012, 2016–2022)

Timeline

Discography

Studio albums 
 Nasty Savage (1985)
 Indulgence (1987)
 Penetration Point (1989)
 Psycho Psycho (2004)

Other releases 
 Wage of Mayhem Demo (1984)
 Live in Brandon Bootleg (1985)
 Abstract Reality EP (1988)
 Wage of Mayhem EP (2003)
 Cleveland 87 Live (2003)
 Wage of Mayhem + Rarities (1983–1985) Compilation (2021)

References

External links 
 

Musical groups established in 1983
Musical groups disestablished in 1989
Musical groups reestablished in 2002
Musical groups disestablished in 2004
American thrash metal musical groups
Heavy metal musical groups from Florida
Musical groups reestablished in 2016
People from Brandon, Florida
Musical quintets
1983 establishments in Florida
Metal Blade Records artists
Death metal musical groups from Florida